Caleb Darrell Holman (born January 7, 1984) is an American former professional stock car racing driver. He last competed part-time in the NASCAR Camping World Truck Series, driving the No. 75 Toyota Tundra and Chevrolet Silverado for Henderson Motorsports.

Racing career

Early years 
The son of an amateur racer, Holman started racing by running go-karts and late models during his teenage years, culminating with two ARCA Racing Series starts at age nineteen.

X-1R Pro Cup 
Starting in 2007, Holman raced mainly in the Pro Cup Series. He collected his first win in 2008 on his way to a sixth-place points finish. In 2009, Holman secured three poles in twelve races but could not close the deal in any of them. A dominant 2010 season ensued in which he won four races and finished runner-up, the closest finish yet to a championship. Holman backed up those results in 2011 when he led all but five races and recorded top tens in all but three. The efforts were scaled back in 2012 as Holman started to move up to the NASCAR Camping World Truck Series. In 2013, he won two races while running half the fourteen-race schedule. Returning to the series full-time in 2014, Holman won half the races, including the final four to win the championship. He earned almost $70,000 for that championship.

NASCAR 
Holman started racing in the NASCAR Busch Grand National (now Xfinity) series in 2003. He attempted five races, qualified for two and finished one, at the Milwaukee Mile. He then made one race for Ortec Racing in 2004. He then teamed up with Henderson Motorsports for the first time two years later, attempting five races and qualifying for one. His one attempt with the team in 2007 ended in a crash.

Starting in 2012, Holman rekindled his relationship with Henderson to run a partial Camping World Truck Series schedule, mostly on short tracks. In 2013, Holman branched out to superspeedways, running for Henderson in the race at Talladega Superspeedway, but he crashed out, though he ran well on short tracks. Once again entering a restrictor plate race and short track races, Holman almost made the top ten at Martinsville Speedway in 2014.  He was running in the top ten, but contact with David Starr resulted in a flat tire. Continuing his partial schedule in 2015, Holman recorded his first top ten at Martinsville with sponsorship from Tide Pods. He recorded his first intermediate track top ten in 2015, and won time trials at Eldora, but was wrecked by Stewart Friesen.  Holman announced his retirement from NASCAR events via Facebook on September 19, 2017 to become a leader at his church.

Motorsports career results

NASCAR
(key) (Bold – Pole position awarded by qualifying time. Italics – Pole position earned by points standings or practice time. * – Most laps led.)

Busch Series

Camping World Truck Series

K&N Pro Series East

ARCA Re/Max Series
(key) (Bold – Pole position awarded by qualifying time. Italics – Pole position earned by points standings or practice time. * – Most laps led.)

References

External links
 

1984 births
Living people
NASCAR drivers
People from Abingdon, Virginia
Racing drivers from Virginia
ARCA Menards Series drivers
CARS Tour drivers